Liu Qingnan is a Chinese chess Grandmaster.

Chess career
He played in the Chess World Cup 2013, being defeated by Wang Hao in the first round.

References

External links 

Liu Qingnan chess games at 365Chess.com

1992 births
Living people
Chinese chess players
Chess grandmasters